The Hertzsprung Gap is a feature of the Hertzsprung–Russell diagram for a star cluster. It is named after Ejnar Hertzsprung, who first noticed the absence of stars in the region of the Hertzsprung–Russell diagram between A5 and G0 spectral type and between +1 and −3 absolute magnitudes (i.e. between the top of the main sequence and the red giants for stars above roughly 1.5 solar mass). When a star during its evolution crosses the Hertzsprung gap, it means that it has finished core hydrogen burning.

Stars do exist in the Hertzsprung gap region, but because they move through this section of the Hertzsprung–Russell diagram very quickly in comparison to the lifetime of the star (thousands of years, compared to tens of billions of years for the lifetime of the star), that portion of the diagram is less densely populated. 
Full Hertzsprung–Russell diagrams of the 11,000 Hipparcos mission targets show a handful of stars in that region.

See also
 Subgiant

References

Hertzsprung–Russell classifications
Stellar evolution
Subgiant stars